300 metre rifle (formerly called free rifle) is the name of two ISSF shooting events:

 300 m rifle three positions
 300 m rifle prone
 300 m standard rifle